Drake Run is a  long 1st order tributary to the Youghiogheny River in Somerset County, Pennsylvania.

Variant names
According to the Geographic Names Information System, it has also been known historically as:
Drakes Run

Course
Drake Run rises about 3 miles north of Draketown, Pennsylvania, and then flows south to join the Youghiogheny River about 0.75 miles northwest of Huston.

Watershed
Drake Run drains  of area, receives about 48.3 in/year of precipitation, has a wetness index of 374.92, and is about 92% forested.

See also
List of rivers of Pennsylvania

References

Tributaries of the Youghiogheny River
Rivers of Pennsylvania
Rivers of Somerset County, Pennsylvania